The following lists events that happened during 1900 in South Africa.

Incumbents
 Governor of the Cape of Good Hope and High Commissioner for Southern Africa:Alfred Milner.
 Governor of the Colony of Natal: Charles Bullen Hugh Mitchell.
 State President of the Orange Free State: Martinus Theunis Steyn.
 State President of the South African Republic: Paul Kruger.
 Prime Minister of the Cape of Good Hope: William Philip Schreiner (until 17 June), John Gordon Sprigg (starting 17 June).
 Prime Minister of the Colony of Natal: Albert Henry Hime.

Events

January
 10 – Frederick Roberts arrives at Cape Town to replace Redvers Henry Buller as commander-in-chief of the British forces in South Africa, accompanied by Herbert Kitchener as his chief-of-staff.
 10 – Barolong chief Wessel Montshiwa advises his people not to assist the British during the siege of Mafeking.
 19–24 – Boer forces under the command of Louis Botha defeat the British forces under the command of Redvers Buller during the Battle of Spioenkop. 
 21 – George Labram completes the gun Long Cecil during the Siege of Kimberley.
 24 – The Boer government of the Transvaal holds peace talks with the British.

February
 5 – British forces under the command of Redvers Henry Buller attack Boer forces under the command of Louis Botha and are defeated during the Battle of Vaal Krantz.
 14 – British reinforcements arrive.
 15 – The Siege of Kimberley is relieved by a cavalry division under General John French.
 18–27 – British forces under command of Frederick Roberts defeat the Boers during the Battle of Paardeberg.
 27 – General Piet Cronje is captured.
 28 – The Siege of Ladysmith ends with the successful Relief of Ladysmith.

March
 13 – British forces under command of Frederick Roberts take Bloemfontein.
 13 – A Joint Diplomatic Delegation consisting of Abraham Fischer and C.H. Wessels for the Orange Free State and A.D.W. Wolmarans for the South African Republic, with J.M. de Bruin as secretary, embarks at Lourenço Marques for Europe and the United States, seeking international intervention in the South African War and aid for the beleaguered Boer republics.

May
 3 – The Battle of Brandfort takes place between British forces under command of Frederick Roberts and the Boers under command of General De la Rey.
 18 – The Siege of Mafeking is relieved.
 28 – The Orange Free State is annexed to the Cape Colony.

June
 5 – British forces under command of Frederick Roberts take Pretoria.
 11 – British forces under command of B.T. Mahon occupies Potchefstroom.

July
 2 – British forces occupy Utrecht after defeating the defending citizens the previous day.
 3 – The British abandons Utrecht upon receiving reports of General Grobler's approach.
 3 – British forces under Col. Baden-Powell evacuate Rustenburg.

August
 21–27 – The Battle of Bergendal between the Boers and British forces takes place on the farm Bergendal near Belfast.
 28 – British troops march into Machadodorp.

October
 Britain annexes Transvaal

November
 29 – Herbert Kitchener succeeds Frederick Roberts as commander-in-chief of the British forces in South Africa and implements a scorched earth strategy.

December
 27 – Emily Hobhouse arrives in Cape Town.

Births
 26 March – Jackie Tindall, Springbok rugby union player, is born in Stellenbosch.
 14 May – Johannes du Plessis Scholtz, linguist, author and historian, is born in the Hottentots-Holland district of the Cape Colony.

Deaths
 28 March – Petrus Jacobus Joubert, a South African Republic Triumvirate member, dies from peritonitis at the age of 76 at Pretoria.
 3 June – Mary Kingsley, an English ethnographer, scientific writer, and explorer, dies when contracting typhoid from helping Boer POWs
 29 October – Prince Christian Victor of Schleswig-Holstein, eldest son of Princess Helena, third daughter of Queen Victoria, dies after contracting malaria during the Boer War

Railways

Railway lines opened
 25 July – Natal – New Hanover to Greytown, .
 8 August – Natal – Park Rynie to Umzinto, .
 8 August – Natal – Kelso Junction to Mtwalume, .
 5 December – Cape Eastern – Bowker's Park to Tarkastad, .

Locomotives
Cape
 Two redesigned 6th Class 4-6-0 steam locomotives are placed in service by the Cape Government Railways. In 1912 they would be designated  on the South African Railways.
 Four 2-6-0 tank locomotives that are destined for the Nederlandsche-Zuid-Afrikaansche Spoorweg-Maatschappij are intercepted by the Imperial Military Railways (IMR) and diverted to Indwe Collieries. After the war they would be designated  on the Cape Government Railways.
 The Port Elizabeth Harbour Board places two 2-6-0 Mogul saddle-tank locomotives in shunting service at the Port Elizabeth Harbour.
 The first of six Scotia Class 0-6-2 tender locomotives enters service with the Cape Copper Company on its  gauge Namaqualand Railway between Port Nolloth and O'okiep.

Transvaal
 Two new Cape gauge locomotive types enter service on the Imperial Military Railways (IMR):
 Due to a shortage of locomotives, six tank locomotives destined for the Western Australian Government Railways are diverted to South Africa, where they become known as the Western Australians.
 Twenty-five Cape 7th Class locomotives are purchased and three more that were intended for the Pretoria-Pietersburg Railway are commandeered by the Imperial Military Railways.
 The British War Office places two Sirdar class 0-4-0T narrow gauge tank steam locomotives in service near Germiston. In 1912 they would become  on the South African Railways.

References

 
South Africa
Years in South Africa